The 1974–75 La Liga was the 44th season since its establishment. The season began on 7 September 1974, and concluded on 25 May 1975.

Team locations

League table

Results table

Pichichi Trophy

References 
 La Liga 1974/1975
 Primera División 1974/75
 Futbolme.com
 All rounds in La Liga 1974/1975
 List of La Liga Champions

External links 
  Official LFP Site

La Liga seasons
1974–75 in Spanish football leagues
Spain